Damadola is a village in the Bajaur Agency of the Federally Administered Tribal Areas in Pakistan, about  from the Afghanistan border, it is located at 34° 48' 20N 71° 28' 0E at an altitude of 1082 metres (3553 feet). The village gained international attention in early 2006 after the U.S. launched an airstrike on Damadola killing at least 18 people. It was captured by Frontier Corps from Taliban by February 6, 2010.

See also
Khosrow Sofla
Tarok Kolache

References

External links
Al-Qaeda chief dies in missile air strike The Guardian June 1, 2008

Populated places in Bajaur District